Psilopezia is a genus of fungi in the family Pyronemataceae. The genus was circumscribed by British mycologist Miles Berkeley in 1847.

References

Pyronemataceae
Pezizales genera